Christina O is a private motor yacht that once belonged to billionaire Greek shipowner Aristotle Onassis. At 99.13 metres long, she is the 59th largest yacht in the world as of 2022.

History

The boat originally served as a Canadian anti-submarine River-class frigate called HMCS Stormont, launched in 1943. HMCS Stormont served as a convoy escort during the Battle of the Atlantic and was present at the Normandy landings. Onassis purchased the Stormont after the end of World War II, as it was one of the many surplus naval vessels. Purchasing the ship at scrap value of US$34,000, Onassis then spent an additional US$4 million to convert the vessel into a luxurious superyacht, named after his daughter Christina. 

The conversion made full use of the navy ship's size and powerful naval engineering systems to create large, ornate interiors and elaborate luxuries: such as a mosaic swimming pool that once drained can be raised up to deck level to become a dance floor. Christina O set a new standard for lavish personal yachts, especially as she was rebuilt amidst the austerity of post-war Europe. The yacht was remodelled by architect Cäsar Pinnau, and the children's dining room was designed and painted by the illustrator Ludwig Bemelmans.

A competitive rivalry with Stavro Niarchos likely drove some decisions around the purchase and outfitting of the ship by Onassis. 

After her marriage to Onassis two decades later, Jacqueline Onassis selected the pastel color scheme and decor in all of the cabins.

Notable passengers
Apart from Onassis's mistress Maria Callas and his wife Jackie Kennedy Onassis, he entertained celebrities such as Umberto Agnelli, Giovanni Battista Meneghini, Richard Burton, Clementine Churchill, Diana Churchill, Winston Churchill, Jacqueline de Ribes, John F. Kennedy, Greta Garbo, Rainier III, Prince of Monaco, Grace Kelly, Anthony Montague Browne, Rudolf Nureyev, Begum Om Habibeh Aga Khan, J. Paul Getty, Eva Perón, Françoise Sagan, Frank Sinatra, Elizabeth Taylor, John Wayne.

In 1956 the wedding of Rainier III, Prince of Monaco, and Grace Kelly held its reception on Christina O.

Ownership
Aristotle Onassis willed ownership of the yacht to his only heir, daughter Christina. In the event that Christina did not want to take ownership, the vessel would have gone to his second wife Jacqueline Kennedy Onassis. If in turn, Kennedy Onassis refused to take ownership, the vessel would be turned over to the Greek government, on condition that maintenance work was carried out and the vessel then offered for use to each incumbent head of Greek state as presidential yacht. Upon Aristotle Onassis's death in 1975, Christina Onassis donated the yacht to the Greek government as a presidential yacht.
 
After the Greek government changed the name of the Christina O to Argo,  she was allowed to decay and was eventually put up for sale at US$16 million in the early 1990s. She went unsold. In 1996, an attempted sale to American Alexander Blastos fell through when his deposit check bounced; he was later convicted of wire fraud as a result. 

The vessel was purchased in 1998 by fellow Greek ship owner magnate John Paul Papanicolaou, an Onassis family friend who secured it in a government-sponsored auction. He reverted her name back to Christina O, in tribute to the late Christina Onassis,  who had died in 1988, and undertook a major refurbishment between January 1999 and April 2001 that cost over $50 million, transformed ship into a modern high-quality luxury charter yacht. Papanicolaou hired Naval architect Costas Carabelas to spearhead the vessel's 1998 refit, who engaged interior architect Apostolos Molindris, the firm Decon to manage construction and the Croatian Viktor Lenac Shipyard to carry it out. The Christina O Limited Partnership bought the yacht for €65 million in 2000.

Amenities
Christina O has a master suite, eighteen passenger staterooms, and numerous indoor and outdoor living areas, all connected by a spiral staircase. Compared to a typical 21st-century superyacht, her staterooms are small and Christina O lacks the indoor boat storage that is now standard; however, the number of living areas is large, and the amount of outdoor deck space is generous. The aft main deck has an outdoor pool with a minotaur-themed mosaic floor that rises at the push of a button to become a dance floor. Bar appointments included whales' teeth carved into pornographic scenes from Homer's Odyssey. The bar stools in Ari's Bar retain the original upholstery crafted from soft, fine leather made from the foreskins of whales.

See also
 List of motor yachts by length
 Yacht

References

Aristotle Onassis
Motor yachts
1943 ships

External links 